Vishwaroopam is a 1978 Indian Malayalam-language film directed by Narayanan P. V. & Vasudevan T. K. The film stars M. G. Soman, Jayan, Vincent, Vidhubala, K. P. Ummer and Sankaradi .

Cast 
M. G. Soman
Jayan
Vincent
Vidhubala
K. P. Ummer
Sankaradi
Prema
Praveena
Rajasree 
Mydhili

Soundtrack
The music was composed by M. S. Viswanathan and the lyrics were written by Mankombu Gopalakrishnan.

References

1978 films
1970s Malayalam-language films
Films scored by M. S. Viswanathan